The 2000 London–Sydney Marathon was the fourth running of the London–Sydney Marathon. The rally took place between 3 June and 4 July 2000. The event covered 10,000 miles (16,000 km) through Europe, Asia and Australia. It was won by Stig Blomqvist and Ben Rainsford in a Ford Capri Perana.

Background
In 2000, Nick Brittan and his company, Trans World Events, who had organise the 1993 edition and other similar endurance events in the 1990s decided to organise another London–Sydney Marathon, once again featuring pre-1971 cars as the 'Millennium Celebration of the first epic event in 1968'. 
The 2000 edition would see former World Rally Champions Hannu Mikkola and Stig Blomqvist as well as former World Rally Championship Runner-Up Michèle Mouton and former Grand Prix winner Clay Regazzoni competing in the event.
The route would see competitors cross Europe in the first fourteen days of the event before the cars would be airlifted by the Antonov An-124 cargo planes hired by TWE from Turkey to Thailand with competitors driving through Thailand and Malaysia for the next eight days before being airlifted to Australia for the last ten days of the rally.

Results

References

Rally raid races
Rally racing series
London-Sydney Marathon